Kettle logic (la logique du chaudron in the original French) is a rhetorical device wherein one uses multiple arguments to defend a point, but the arguments are inconsistent with each other.

Jacques Derrida uses this expression in reference to the humorous "kettle-story", that Sigmund Freud relates in The Interpretation of Dreams (1900) and Jokes and Their Relation to the Unconscious (1905).

Philosophy and psychoanalysis 
The name "logique du chaudron" comes from Jacques Derrida from an example used by Sigmund Freud for the analysis of "Irma's dream" in The Interpretation of Dreams and in his Jokes and Their Relation to the Unconscious.

Freud relates the story of a man who was accused by his neighbour of having returned a kettle in a damaged condition and the three arguments he offers.

That he had returned the kettle undamaged
That it was already damaged when he borrowed it 
That he had never borrowed it in the first place

Though the three arguments are inconsistent, Freud notes that it is so much the better, as if even one is found to be true then the man must be acquitted.

The kettle "logic" of the dream-work is related to what Freud calls the embarrassment-dream of being naked, in which contradictory opposites are yoked together in the dream. Freud said that in a dream, incompatible (contradictory) ideas are simultaneously admitted.

See also
 Dilemma
 Alternative pleading: some forms constitute legal use of kettle logic
 Argument in the alternative
 List of fallacies

References

External links
 "Kettle Logic – Freud on Defensive Arguments"

Informal fallacies
Dream
Rhetorical techniques
Jacques Derrida
Sigmund Freud